El Cerrito Plaza station is a Bay Area Rapid Transit (BART) station in El Cerrito, California, located adjacent to the El Cerrito Plaza shopping center. It primarily serves southern El Cerrito, northern Albany, and Kensington, along with nearby portions of Berkeley and Richmond. Nearly identical in form to El Cerrito del Norte station, El Cerrito Plaza station has two side platforms serving the line's two elevated tracks, with a fare lobby underneath. The Ohlone Greenway runs through the station area.

The station opened on January 29, 1973. As with El Cerrito del Norte station, the escalator walls feature tile mosaics by Alfonso Pardiñas. UC Berkeley music professor Jorge Liderman committed suicide at the station on February 3, 2008.

The elevators to the platforms are outside of the paid area. BART plans to add a dedicated faregate for each elevator in 2022.

Bus connections

Busways on both sides of the station serve a number of AC Transit bus routes:
Local: 71, 72, 72M, 79, 80
Transbay: G
School: 667, 668, 675, 684

The busways are also used by the Bear Transit RFS route. Several other AC Transit routes — including rapid route 72R, Transbay routes L and LC, and All Nighter route 800 — run on San Pablo Avenue  to the west.

References

External links 

BART - El Cerrito Plaza

Bay Area Rapid Transit stations in Contra Costa County, California
Stations on the Orange Line (BART)
Stations on the Red Line (BART)
El Cerrito, California
Railway stations in the United States opened in 1973
Bus stations in Contra Costa County, California